Ocean Star Cruises is a cruise line based in Mexico City, Mexico. It was founded in 2010, the first Mexican cruise line. The first ship in its fleet was the MV Ocean Star Pacific (launched on 9 July 1970 for RCCL), purchased in December 2010 to become the first ship in the fleet. She entered service on 10 April 2011. The cruise ship sailed the waters of the Mexican Riviera, with embarkation ports at Acapulco and Manzanillo. The company planned to expand its fleet to include six additional newly built vessels in the next 5 years. Ocean Star Cruises no longer operates cruise ships.

Fleet

References

External links 
 www.oceanstar.com.mx

Cruise lines
Transport companies established in 2010